Mahood is the surname of several notable people:

 Alan Mahood (born 1973), Scottish footballer
 Alex Mahood, lead guitarist for the English alternative band the Littl'ans
 Alex B. Mahood (1888–1970), architect from West Virginia
 Beverley Mahood (born 1974), Northern Irish/Canadian country music singer
 Harry Mahood  ( born 1962 ), Canadian hockey player and coach
 Hattie Mahood (1860–1940), British Baptist deacon and women's suffragist
 James Adams Mahood, a surveyor for the Canadian Pacific Railway in the 19th Century
 Jonathan Mahood, author of the comic strip Bleeker: The Rechargeable Dog
 Kim Mahood, Australian writer and artist
 Marguerite Mahood, Australian visual artist and art historian
 Mike Mahood (born 1975), Canadian field hockey player
 Molly Mahood (1919–2017), British literary scholar

Places named after James Adams Mahood

 Mahood Lake, a lake in the Cariboo region of British Columbia, Canada
 Mahood River, a river in the Cariboo region of British Columbia, Canada
 Mahood Falls, a waterfall at the outlet of Mahood Lake into the Mahood River
 Mount Mahood (Wells Gray), a mountain on the south side of Mahood Lake
 Mount Mahood (Rockies), a mountain in the Victoria Cross Ranges of the Canadian Rockies